Larrasoaña is a village in Navarre, Spain, located within the municipality of Esteríbar. The village is located on the French Way path of the Camino de Santiago.

References 

Municipalities in Navarre